Hedt or HEDT may refer to:

 Ken Hedt (1936–2006), Australian rules football player
 High-end desktop computer, a desktop computer